"The Killer" is a short story by Stephen King. Written in the early 1960s, it was first published in issue #202 of Famous Monsters of Filmland in spring 1994.

Plot summary 
The protagonist of the story awakens in a munitions factory; he is unable to remember his name or anything else. Seizing a gun, he demands that another worker tell him who he is; after the worker ignores him, he clubs him with the gun. After a man on an overhead catwalk flees from the protagonist, he shoots him; the wounded man sounds an alarm. As the protagonist attempts to flee, he is intercepted by men wielding "energy guns"; he shoots one of them before being hit with "energy beams". The story ends with the protagonist being loaded into a truck. A watching man notes that "one of them turns killer every now and then", with another man musing that "they're making these robots too good", revealing that the protagonist was a malfunctioning robot.

Publication 
King wrote "The Killer" as a young teenager; it is a rewrite of his story "I've Got to Get Away!", which was self-published as part of the collection People, Places and Things in 1960. King submitted "The Killer" (as Steve King) to Forrest J Ackerman for the magazine Spacemen; it was the first story he submitted for publication. While not accepted at the time, the story was later published in issue #202 of Famous Monsters of Filmland in spring 1994 with an introduction by Ackerman. It has never been collected.

Reception 
Rocky Wood describes "The Killer" as "derivative of pulp fiction" but "fairly well written for a probably 13 or 14 year old". Reflecting on the story, King wrote "I was still in the Ro-Man phase of my development, and this particular tale undoubtedly owed a great deal to the killer ape with the goldfish bowl on his head."

References

See also
 Stephen King short fiction bibliography

Short stories by Stephen King
1994 short stories
Science fiction short stories
Works originally published in American magazines
Works originally published in horror fiction magazines